The anterior external arcuate fibers (ventral external arcuate fibers) vary as to their prominence: in some cases they form an almost continuous layer covering the medullary pyramids and olivary body, while in other cases they are barely visible on the surface.

Most of them reach the surface by way of the anterior median fissure, and arch backward over the pyramid.

Reinforced by others which emerge between the pyramid and olive, they pass backward over the olive and lateral district of the medulla oblongata, and enter the inferior peduncle.

As the fibers arch across the pyramid, they enclose a small nucleus which lies in front of and medial to the pyramid.

This is named the arcuate nucleus, and is serially continuous above with the pontine nuclei in the pons; it contains small fusiform (spindle-shaped) cells, around which some of the arcuate fibers end, and from which others arise.

Additional images

References

External links
 

Medulla oblongata